Luis Aarón Casas Roque (born 21 October 2004) is a Mexican professional footballer who plays as a forward for Liga MX club Necaxa.

Career statistics

Club

Notes

References

2004 births
Living people
Mexican footballers
Mexico youth international footballers
Association football forwards
Club Necaxa footballers
Liga MX players